Thomas Raymond McDonald (4 June 1915 – 18 December 1992) was Labor Party Member of the Tasmania House of Assembly for the electorate of Wilmot (Lyons) from 2 May 1959 until his defeat at the election held on 10 May 1969. He was the son of James McDonald and the brother of John Joseph McDonald, both also members of the Tasmanian Parliament.
McDonald was a journalist on the Hobart Mercury after leaving Parliament.

References

Further reading 
 

1915 births
1992 deaths
Members of the Tasmanian House of Assembly
Australian Labor Party members of the Parliament of Tasmania
20th-century Australian politicians
20th-century Australian journalists
The Mercury (Hobart) people